Robert Pauli Scherer (1906–1960) was an American inventor who founded the RP Sherer Corporation.

In 1933, Scherer invented the rotary die encapsulation process, revolutionizing the soft-gelatin encapsulation field.  He founded the R. P. Scherer Corporation to commercialize his invention.  R.P. Scherer was acquired by Cardinal Health, Inc. in 1998. and subsequently named Catalent Pharma Solutions.

Notes

External links
 The Catalent Pharma Solution homepage
The Scherer Laboratories homepage
Scherer's family home at Michigan Historical Markers

1906 births
1960 deaths
American chemical engineers
American health care businesspeople
20th-century American businesspeople
20th-century American engineers